The Men's lightweight pair event at the 2010 South American Games was held over March 22 at 10:00.

Medalists

Records

Results

References
Final

Lightweight Pair M